Gladwin Conrad Hermon Kotelawala, MBE (18 April 1914 – ?) was a Ceylonese (Sri Lankan) businessmen and a former Member of Parliament.

Gladwin Kotelawala was the son of Sir Henry Kotelawala, a leading colonial-era legislator. He initially studied at Royal College, Colombo, before his father transferred him to Trinity College, Kandy. Kotelawala ran away to India before completing his studies, after his family located him and brought him back home he ran away again this time to Singapore, where he resisted all attempts to repatriate him. Kotelawala's move to Malaya allowed him to establish a successful business and become a prominent member of the Ceylonese community there. With the onset of World War II and the subsequent Japanese occupation of Malaya, he served as a price control inspector in Malacca before joining the Indian Independence League (IIL) of Subhas Chandra Bose and forming the Ceylon Department serving as its secretary.

His role in the IIL is controversial and after the end of the war he was briefly arrested but soon released by the British. On his return to Ceylon he entered politics and became a member of the Badulla Urban Council. He was made a Member of the Order of the British Empire for social services in Uva Province in the 1952 Birthday Honours, which led to the belief that Kotelawala acted as an agent for British Intelligence in Malaya. Following the death of Sir Leo Fernando, the sitting member for the Buttala electorate, Kotelawala ran, as the United National Party candidate, and was elected at subsequent parliamentary by-election held on 5 March 1955. At the 3rd parliamentary election, held between 5 April 1956 and 10 April 1956, he was unable to retain his seat and was defeated by the Sri Lanka Freedom Party candidate, W. G. M. Albert Silva, by 3,281 votes.

See also 
List of political families in Sri Lanka

References

External links
The saga of the Kotelawala family 

Members of the 2nd Parliament of Ceylon
Ceylonese Members of the Order of the British Empire
Malaysian people of Sri Lankan descent
1914 births
Year of death missing
Alumni of Royal College, Colombo